Rzhanov Institute of Semiconductor Physics of the Siberian Branch of the RAS is a research institute in Akademgorodok of Novosibirsk, Russia. It was founded in 1964.

History
The institute was created in 1964 by merging the Institute of Solid State Physics and Semiconductor Electronics and the Institute of Radiophysics and Electronics.

In the 1970s, the institute began to work on developing molecular-beam epitaxy methods.

Scientific activity
Development of the physical fundamentals of microelectronics, acousto-electronics,  microphotoelectronics, quantum electronics; the study of physical phenomena in semiconductor thin-film structures etc.

References

Research institutes in Novosibirsk
Semiconductor companies of Russia
Research institutes established in 1964
1964 establishments in the Soviet Union
Research institutes in the Soviet Union